Gymnopilus tonkinensis is a species of mushroom in the family Hymenogastraceae. It was given its current name by mycologist Rolf Singer in 1951.

See also

List of Gymnopilus species

References

External links
Gymnopilus tonkinensis at Index Fungorum

tonkinensis